Hugh Reid Jack (19 December 1929 – 19 December 2018) was an Australian long jumper who competed in the 1956 Summer Olympics. Jack competed for Williamstown Athletics Club for 15 years and coached for more than 40 years.

References

External links
Hugh Jack at Australian Athletics Historical Results

1929 births
2018 deaths
Australian male long jumpers
Olympic athletes of Australia
Athletes (track and field) at the 1956 Summer Olympics